Greatest Hits: Live & Kickin' is the second live album by American country band Asleep at the Wheel. Recorded on August 9, 1991 at the 30th annual Austin Aqua Festival, which was held at Auditorium Shores in Austin, Texas, it was produced by the band's frontman Ray Benson and released on March 24, 1992 as the group's second and final album on Arista Records. The album was supported by the release of "(Get Your Kicks on) Route 66" as its one single.

Following the release of Asleep at the Wheel's eleventh studio album Keepin' Me Up Nights in 1990, fiddler Larry Franklin was replaced by Ricky Turpin, who made his debut for the group on ''Live & Kickin (Franklin featured as a guest). The album was the band's last to feature bassist Jon Mitchell, who was replaced by David Miller shortly after its release.

Production
Greatest Hits: Live & Kickin''' documents Asleep at the Wheel's August 9, 1991 performance at the 30th annual Austin Aqua Festival, held at Auditorium Shores in Austin, Texas. The album was released by Arista Records on March 24, 1992. The recording of Bobby Troup's "(Get Your Kicks on) Route 66" was issued as its sole single the same month. The single's release coincided with the 66th anniversary of the titular U.S. Route 66. The band celebrated the anniversary with a run of shows at ten cities on the road's route in May 1992.

The album was Asleep at the Wheel's first release to feature fiddler Ricky Turpin, who was chosen by his predecessor Larry Franklin to take his place when he left the band. It is also the last to feature bassist Jon Mitchell and the last to feature steel guitarist John Ely as an official member; within a few months of the album's release, the departed pair had been replaced by David Miller and Cindy Cashdollar, respectively.

Former pianist Floyd Domino makes a guest appearance on the recording of "Jambalaya".

Reception
Reviewing the album for AllMusic, writer Stephen Thomas Erlewine submitted that "Greatest Hits... Live & Kickin showcases Asleep at the Wheel running through their best-known material in a kinetic live setting. It's a great introduction to Asleep at the Wheel – they are never better than they are in concert, and the selection brings out the best in the musicians." "Black and White Rag", issued as the B-side to "(Get Your Kicks on) Route 66", was nominated for the Grammy Award for Best Country Instrumental Performance at the 35th Annual Grammy Awards, three years after the studio version of the song's nomination for the same award.

Track listing

Personnel

Asleep at the Wheel
Ray Benson – vocals, guitar, production, mixing
John Ely – Hawaiian steel guitar
Jon Mitchell – bass, vocals
Tim Alexander – piano, accordion, vocals
David Sanger – drums
Ricky Turpin – fiddle
Michael Francis – saxophone

Additional personnel
Larry Franklin – fiddle, vocals
Floyd Domino – piano 
Greg Klinginsmith – engineering
Malcolm Harper – engineering
Brent Campbell – engineering assistance
Gordon Garrison – engineering assistance
Larry Seyer – mixing

References

External links

Asleep at the Wheel albums
1992 live albums
Arista Records live albums
Arista Nashville albums